Michael Lawrence Hendricks is an American psychologist, suicidologist, and an advocate for the LGBT community. He has worked in private practice as a partner at the Washington Psychological Center, P.C. in northwest Washington, D.C., since 1999. Hendricks is an adjunct professor of clinical psychopharmacology and has taught at Argosy University, Howard University, and Catholic University of America. He is a Fellow of the American Psychological Association (APA).

Early life and education
Hendricks was raised in a small conservative town in Western Michigan. He remarked that he spent much of his early life in a state of "quasi-shame" and in "a stealth existence" due to being gay. Hendricks attended Michigan State University as a pre-med student before switching from medicine to a degree in social psychology. He later found that while the majority of social scientists worked in academia, he preferred clinical work under the Boulder model. He completed a master's thesis focused on HIV. Hendricks earned a doctorate in clinical psychology from American University. His dissertation, published in 1993, is titled "The occurrence of suicidal ideation over the course of HIV infection in gay men: A cross-sectional study". His doctoral advisor was Alan Berman.

Career
At the beginning of his career in the early 1990s, the HIV/AIDS crisis influenced Hendricks to address LGBT issues. He is a clinician and researcher and has investigated depression, suicide, substance abuse, compulsive behaviors, HIV, and gender diversity issues at the National Cancer Institute, Georgetown University Medical Center, and Virginia Commonwealth University. Since 1999, he has worked as a partner at the Washington Psychological Center, P.C. He has worked in various facilities including Spring Grove Hospital Center and Whitman-Walker Health. He was a Chief Psychologist at Umoja Methadone treatment Center and was Chief of Outpatient Mental Health Services at the Washington, D.C. He is board certified in clinical psychology from by the American Board of Professional Psychology.

Hendricks is a Fellow of the American Psychological Association (APA), the Society for the Psychology of Sexual Orientation and Gender Diversity, the Society of Clinical Psychology, and the Society for the Psychological Study of Social Issues. He was the chair of the Research Committee of the Virginia HIV Community Planning Committee for 11 years. Hendricks is an APA Council representative and past president of Division 44, which is the APA's Society for the Psychology of Sexual Orientation and Gender Diversity. He has held positions as adjunct professor in at Argosy University, Howard University, and Catholic University of America., where he has taught graduate-level Clinical Psychopharmacology. He is the lead author, with co-author Rylan Testa on the seminal paper that applied Ilan Meyer's minority stress model to transgender people, published in 2012. He was awarded an APA Presidential Citation.

Hendricks is a member of and is a certified healthcare provider of the World Professional Association for Transgender Health, American Psychology-Law Society, and the American Association of Suicidology.

Personal life
Hendricks had a "stealth" lifestyle as a gay man while living in a small town in Michigan. He is currently "very out".

Selected works

See also 

 LGBT people in science

References

External links 
 

20th-century American educators
20th-century American scientists
21st-century American educators
21st-century American scientists
21st-century American psychologists
Michigan State University alumni
American University alumni
Living people
Fellows of the American Psychological Association
Suicidologists
LGBT people from Michigan
American LGBT scientists
Howard University faculty
Catholic University of America faculty
Psychopharmacologists
Year of birth missing (living people)
Gay academics
Gay scientists
LGBT psychologists